Jozef Talian (born 5 September 1985 in Bardejov) is a Slovak football goalkeeper who currently plays for club FC Lokomotíva Košice.

Career
He made his Corgoň Liga debut for 1. FC Tatran Prešov against MFK Dubnica.

Ahead of the 2019–20 season, Talian joined FC Lokomotíva Košice as a playing assistant manager.

Honours 
Winner of 2007/2008 Slovak Second Football League with 1. FC Tatran Prešov.

References

External links
 1. FC Tatran Prešov profile
 
 Jozef Talian at Futbalnet

1985 births
Living people
Association football goalkeepers
Slovak footballers
1. FC Tatran Prešov players
Slovak Super Liga players
2. Liga (Slovakia) players
People from Bardejov
Sportspeople from the Prešov Region